A.C. Trento 1921 (nicknamed  or ) is an Italian football club, and the major club in Trento.

In 2014 Società Sportiva Dilettantistica Trento Calcio 1921 S.r.l. went bankrupt. The sports title was transferred to A.C. Trento S.C.S.D.

History

Foundation
The club was founded in 1921.

The team took part to the 1945–46 Serie B–C season.

It in the season 2010–11, from Serie D group B relegated, in the play-out, to Eccellenza Trentino-Alto Adige/Südtirol.

In the season 2011–12 the team was promoted from Eccellenza Trentino–South Tyrol to Serie D after playoffs. The team was relegated again in 2013.

In 2014 Trento was relegated from Eccellenza to Promozione. After the transfer of the sports title to a new company in the same year, the phoenix club won promotion back to Eccellenza in 2016.

In the 2020–21 Serie D season, under the tenure of head coach Carmine Parlato, Trento were crowned Girone C champions, thus returning into professionalism after 18 years in the amateur leagues.

Colors and badge

Colors
The official colors are yellow and blue. They are also the colors of the city of Trento. 
The home jerseys of the club include the colors yellow and blue and can be vertically striped depending on the season. The away jerseys are mostly white or black.

Badge
The badge of the club has the form of a shield. The left half of the logo in the background is blue, the other half yellow. They represent the colors of the club and the city of Trento. In the middle of the badge an eagle is depicted, which is also the coat of arms of Trento. Above the eagle is the inscription "A.C. TRENTO". The founding year "1921" is shown below the eagle.

Stadium

AC Trento plays his home games at Stadio Briamasco. The stadium was opened in 1922 and has a capacity of 4,200 spectators. In the meantime, the stadium was often slightly modernized. The dimensions of the field are 105 by 65 meters (345 by 213 feet) and it is played on natural turf pitch. It consists of north (Tribuna Nord) and south tribune (Tribuna Sud). The north tribune is mostly covered and the south tribune only half. In addition, the arena has an athletics system, which is no longer used.

Two international matches of the Italy U21 team were played in the Stadio Briamasco.

Current squad

Out on loan

Notable players

  Daniele Balli
  Luigi De Agostini
  Angelo Domenghini
  Giuseppe Sannino
  Giuseppe Signori
  Attilio Tesser
  Francesco Toldo
  Marco Pilato
  Gianluca Piaccitali

Notable managers

  Ferenc Hirzer
  Enzo Robotti

References

External links
Official site

Football clubs in Italy
Football clubs in Trentino
Trento
Association football clubs established in 1921
Serie C clubs
Serie D clubs
Phoenix clubs (association football)
1921 establishments in Italy